The  Boston Redskins season was the franchise's 2nd season in the National Football League. The team finished with a record of five wins, five losses, and two ties, and finished in third place in the Eastern Division of the National Football League. This was the first year that the franchise used the name "Redskins", a name used by the team until it was retired in 2020.

Schedule

Standings

Boston Redskins seasons
Boston Redskins
1933 in sports in Massachusetts